= Dugabal =

- Village
- Location in Karnataka, India Dugabal (India)
- Coordinates: 15.737612°N 75.204155°E
- Country: India
- State: Karnataka
- District: Belgaum

Languages
  - Official: Kannada
- Time zone: UTC+5:30 (IST)

Dugabal is a village in Belgaum district in the southern state of Karnataka, India.
